Aphanius saourensis, the Sahara aphanius, is a species of freshwater pupfish belonging to the family Cyprinodontidae. It is endemic to the Oued Saoura river basin in Algeria. The species is threatened by water pollution and water withdrawal for agricultural use; it was evaluated by the IUCN on 17 October 2007 and listed as critically endangered on the Red List, although it is possibly extinct in the wild.

Etymology 
The species name, saourensis, comes from "Saoura", the valley where the fish was collected.

Description 
Like all members of the genus Aphanius, the Sahara aphanius exhibits sexual dimorphism. Females possess brown mottling on their flanks and have transparent fins, whereas the much smaller males have bluish silver body mottling. Their fins have dark bars on them and are often blue in colour.

References 

saourensis